Qeshlaq-e Gharbi Rural District is in Borran District of Aslan Duz County, Ardabil province, Iran. It was formerly in Aslan Duz District of Parsabad County before the district rose to county status as Aslan Duz County. At the census of 2006, its population was 8,184 in 1,551 households; there were 6,910 inhabitants in 1,643 households at the following census of 2011; and in the most recent census of 2016, the population of the rural district was 8,449 in 2,425 households. The largest of its 68 villages was Borran-e Olya, with 1,508 people.

References 

Aslan Duz County

Rural Districts of Ardabil Province

Populated places in Ardabil Province